Valpelline may refer to:
 Valpelline (valley) in the Vallée d'Aoste/Valle d’Aosta, north-west Italy
 Valpelline, Aosta Valley, a commune located in the valley
 The river Buthier, the major river of the valley